Comonecturoides is an extinct genus of prehistoric caudate amphibians, possibly a salamander, from Reed's Quarry 9 of the Morrison Formation, near Como Bluff, Wyoming; the type species is C. marshi. It is considered a nomen dubium because the name is based on non-distinctive remains which cannot be classified in detail.

See also

 Prehistoric amphibian
 List of prehistoric amphibians

References

Prehistoric amphibian genera
Jurassic amphibians of North America
Morrison fauna
Fossil taxa described in 1960
Late Jurassic amphibians